Evariste Ngolok (born November 15, 1988 in Cameroon) is a Cameroonian footballer playing for ÍBV.

Career
Ngolok is a defensive midfielder who made his debut in professional football, being part of the R. Union Saint-Gilloise squad in the 2007-08 season.

References

External links
 Footgoal Profile
 

1988 births
Living people
Cameroonian footballers
Expatriate footballers in Belgium
Expatriate footballers in Cyprus
Expatriate footballers in Iceland
R.S.C. Anderlecht players
K.V.C. Westerlo players
F.C.V. Dender E.H. players
Oud-Heverlee Leuven players
K.S.C. Lokeren Oost-Vlaanderen players
Aris Limassol FC players
Íþróttabandalag Vestmannaeyja players
Belgian Pro League players
Challenger Pro League players
Úrvalsdeild karla (football) players
Cameroonian expatriate footballers
Royale Union Saint-Gilloise players
Cameroonian expatriate sportspeople in Belgium
Association football midfielders